Mehmet Muharrem Kasapoğlu (born 22 December 1976) is a Turkish civil servant and current Minister of Youth and Sports.

Early life
Mehmet Muharrem Kasapoğlu was born in Istanbul, Turkey in 1976. He studied Business administration at Marmara University's Faculty of Economics and Administrative Science, and graduated with a Bachelor's degree. Later, he earned a Master's degree in Local administrations and Decentralization at the same university. He w
carried out works as a researcher, specialist and project coordinator in the field of Management organization at Florida State University's Faculty of Business administration. He earned another Bacholar's degree in Business administration from Palm Beach Atlantic University in Florida. Returned home, Kasapoğlu obtained a Doctor title in Local employment from Istanbul University.

Career
He served in non-governmental organization during his education years in Turkey and abroad. He then worked in the field of international trade in the  private sector. Kasapoğlu served in various tasks at the ministries of Labour and Social Services, National Education and Youth and Sports following his appointment to Advisor to the Prime Minister of Turkey in 2009. During his term as the president of Spor Toto Corpporation, he contributed to the creation of many sports facilities throughout the country, which enabled the spread and accessibility to sports for everyone. He focused on the financing of youth, education and sports activities and increasing sports employment. Further, he worked in coordination with the ministries of Finance, Interior, Justice, and Youth and Sports to fight against illegal sports betting, which harms the national economy.

On 10 July 2018, he was appointed Minister of Youth and Sports in the Cabinet Erdoğan IV.

References

Living people
1976 births
Politicians from Istanbul
Marmara University alumni
Florida State University alumni
Istanbul University alumni
Turkish civil servants
Government ministers of Turkey
Ministers of Youth and Sports of Turkey
Members of the 66th government of Turkey